Refinery CMS, often shortened to Refinery, is a free and open-source content management system written in Ruby as a Ruby on Rails web application with jQuery used as the JavaScript library. Refinery CMS supports Rails 3.2 and Rails 4.2 and Rails 5.1.

Refinery differs from similar products by targeting a non-technical end user and allowing the developer to create a flexible website rapidly by staying as close as possible to the conventions of the Ruby on Rails framework.

History 

Refinery started as a closed sourced project written by David Jones at Resolve Digital in 2004 and went on to be released as open source software under the MIT License on 28 May 2009. Since then it has, under the direction of Philip Arndt and Uģis Ozols, gained popularity and is now the most popular Ruby on Rails CMS  with more than 384 contributors  and an active community extending the application with engines.

Version 1.0.0 was released on 28 May 2011 – exactly 2 years after it was first released as open source software.

Version 2.0.0 was released on 29 February 2012.

Version 2.1.0 was released on 5 August 2013.

Version 3.0.0 was released on 19 September 2015.

Version 4.0.0 was released  on 29 September 2017.

Features 
 Engine architecture
 WYSIWYG content editing
 Localisation (currently supports 29 languages )
 Page management
 Image and File management
 Contact form and inquiry management
 Search engine optimization (SEO)

See also 
Comparison of content management systems
Radiant

References

External links 
 
 Rails Magazine: An Overview of Refinery – a Rails CMS
 Finalists in the New Zealand Open Source Awards 2010

Content management systems
Free software programmed in Ruby
Free content management systems
Software using the MIT license
Website management